Daniel George Scarr (born 24 December 1994) is an English professional footballer who plays as a centre back for  club Plymouth Argyle.

He played for several years in non-league football, including as a member of the Stourbridge team that reached the third round of the 2016–17 FA Cup, before signing for Birmingham City in January 2017. He spent the 2017–18 season on loan to Wycombe Wanderers, and made one EFL Cup appearance for Birmingham before joining Walsall in January 2019. He left the club when his contract expired in June 2021 and signed for League One Plymouth Argyle.

Life and career
Scarr's father, Ian, played non-league football as a goalkeeper before becoming a referee. Scarr himself began his football career at Worcester College of Technology Football Academy in association with Worcester City. He was club captain of the Academy's team, and it was at that stage that he was converted from right back to centre back.

After completing his college course, Scarr played for Midland Alliance (ninth-tier) club Causeway United before moving up two steps of the football pyramid to join Redditch United of the Southern League Premier Division in 2014.

A year later, he signed for Northern Premier League Premier Division (seventh-tier) club Stourbridge, for which he played part-time while working as a fitness trainer in a gym in the Rubery area of Birmingham. In 2015–16 he made 55 appearances in all competitions, performed well, and signed for another season. He was a member of the Stourbridge team that progressed through four rounds of qualifying and two rounds proper to reach the third round of the 2016–17 FA Cup. Drawn away to Wycombe Wanderers of EFL League Two, Stourbridge conceded just after half-time, but with 20 minutes left, a long free kick into the penalty area fell to Scarr who stabbed it home to equalise; Adebayo Akinfenwa restored Wycombe's lead late on. Scarr's performances earned him a place in the Northern Premier League Premier Division Team of the Season.

He promptly went on trial with West Bromwich Albion, and was watched by other clubs including Middlesbrough, Port Vale and Portsmouth, but it was Birmingham Citythe club he supportswho signed him on a two-and-a-half-year contract for an undisclosed fee. Soon after joining the club, he tore a hip flexor and was out of action for the rest of the season.

Scarr joined Wycombe Wanderers on 31 August 2017, on loan until 1 January 2018. After two matches as an unused substitute, Scarr made his Football League debut on 12 September, in the starting eleven for the League Two fixture away to Mansfield Town; he played the whole match, which ended goalless. In a 3–3 draw with Carlisle United in October, Scarr conceded a penalty for what the referee saw as a foul on Shaun Miller; Miller was subsequently charged by the Football Association and became the first player retrospectively suspended for "successful deception of a match official" via a "clear act of simulation". In mid-December, by which time he had made ten league appearances, his loan was extended to the end of the season. Scarr scored his first Football League goal on 22 December with a volley from outside the penalty area to help Wycombe recover from a two-goal deficit away to Coventry City, only to lose 3–2. He established himself in Wycombe's starting eleven in the second half of the campaign, but an injury sustained playing against Cambridge United in March put an end to his season. The team went on to achieve automatic promotion.

He made his debut for Birmingham City in the starting eleven for the visit to Reading in the EFL Cup first round on 14 August 2018; Birmingham lost 2–0.

Scarr joined League One club Walsall on 21 January 2019, signing a two-and-a-half-year deal for an undisclosed fee.

At the end of the 2020–21 season, Scarr turned down Walsall's offer of new terms in favour of joining Plymouth Argyle of League One when his Walsall contract expired. He made his debut on the opening day of the season, playing the whole of a 2–0 defeat away to Rotherham United.

Career statistics

Honours
 Northern Premier League Premier Division Team of the Year: 2016–17

References

1994 births
Living people
English footballers
Association football defenders
Worcester City F.C. players
Redditch United F.C. players
Stourbridge F.C. players
Birmingham City F.C. players
Walsall F.C. players
Wycombe Wanderers F.C. players
Plymouth Argyle F.C. players
Southern Football League players
Northern Premier League players
English Football League players